Józef Wielhorski may refer to:
 Józef Wielhorski (1759-1817), Polish general
 Józef Wielhorski (composer) (1816-1892), Polish composer